BSM may refer to:

Education
Benilde-St. Margaret's, a Catholic, co-educational college prep school in Saint Loius Park, Minnesota, USA
Black-Scholes-Merton formula, a formula to calculate option prices
Black Student Movement, at the University of North Carolina at Chapel Hill, US
Bloomingdale School of Music, Manhattan, New York City, New York, US
British School of Motoring, a British driving school
Budapest Semesters in Mathematics, program for North American students, Budapest, Hungary

Military
Band Sergeant Major, a warrant officer appointment in the British Army
Battery Sergeant Major, a warrant officer appointment in some Commonwealth artillery corps
Bronze Star Medal

Organizations
Bangladesh Society of Microbiologists
Big Scary Monsters Recording Company, a record label based in the UK
Brick Squad Monopoly, a subsidiary of the 1017 Brick Squad Record label
Blue Star Mothers

Science and technology
Bag Source Message, corresponding to an airline bag tag
Basic Safety Message, a type of message sent in dedicated short-range communications, used in automotive
Basic Security Module (OpenBSM), a computer auditing system
Beyond the Standard Model, extensions to, or phenomena not explained by, the standard theory of particle physics
Blind Spot Monitor, a vehicle-based sensor system
Bovine Submaxillary Mucin Coatings, a biocompatible coating used to reduce bacterial cell adhesion
Business semantics management, an approach to align data (formats, content, metadata, etc.) to the business
Business service management, an information technology methodology

Other uses
Baltimore Streetcar Museum, in Baltimore, Maryland, USA
Bata Shoe Museum, in Toronto, Ontario, Canada
Britain's Strongest Man, an annual competition